Mahla Lake is a lake in Douglas County, in the U.S. state of Minnesota.

Mahla Lake was named for M. H. Mahla, a pioneer farmer who settled there.

See also
List of lakes in Minnesota

References

Lakes of Minnesota
Lakes of Douglas County, Minnesota